2007 25th convocation local councils of Republic of Belarus elections were held on 14 January.

General information 
Elections were organized by 1581 territorial committees — 6 regional and Minsk urban, 118 districtal, 13 urban in regional cities, 14 urban in districtal cities, 66 town and 1363 rural committees. Members of 45 political parties participated in committees. 30 October 2006 was a due date for commissions formation. In a single day of 14 January 2007 25th convocation rural, as well as district, urban and regional Concils of deputies election were hold under plurality voting. 22639 deputies were elected. According to official data voters participation was 79% all over the Republic and 60% in Minsk-city.

Participation of parties and candidates nomination
candidates nomination started from 5 November till 4 December 2006.

References

Sources 

Municipal elections
Belarusian municipal elections
Local and municipal elections in Belarus